Warren Willis Heller (November 24, 1910October 29, 1982) was an American football player who played 3 seasons in the National Football League (NFL) with the Pittsburgh Pirates (1934–1936).

Coach Dr. Sutherland observed, "The greatest all-around halfback I ever had the pleasure to coach was Warren Heller. "I saw better runners and passers, but for blocking, general defensive ability and ability to fire the spirit of a team, Heller was peer."

References

All-American college football players
Players of American football from Pittsburgh
American football halfbacks
Pittsburgh Panthers football players
Pittsburgh Pirates (football) players
1910 births
1982 deaths